Thomas Davy (born 1 May 1968, in Paris) is a French former road cyclist. He turned professional in 1992 and ended his cycling career five years later in 1997.

Major results
1991
 1st  Road race, National Amateur Road Championships
1992
 1st Stage 12 Tour de l'Avenir
1993
 1st  Overall Tour de l'Avenir
1994
 1st Stage 4 Circuit de la Sarthe
 2nd Polynormande
 4th GP de la Ville de Rennes
1995
 9th Overall Circuit de la Sarthe

Grand Tour general classification results timeline

References

External links

1968 births
Living people
French male cyclists
Cyclists from Paris